Fernand Toupin  (1930, Montreal–2009 Terrebonne) was a Québécois abstract painter best known as a first-generation member of the avant-garde movement known as Les Plasticiens. Like other members of the group, his shaped paintings drew upon the tradition of geometric abstraction, and he cited Mondrian as a forerunner. In 1959, Toupin began working with a more lyrical, though abstract, way of painting. The last decade of his career saw his return to geometric abstraction. Like Jean-Paul Mousseau, Toupin created works which lay outside the standard boundaries of art such as his stage sets for ballets.

Solo exhibitions
Beginning with his first early-career retrospectives in 1967 and 1972 organized by the Musée d'art contemporain de Montréal and the Canadian Cultural Centre, Paris, Toupin's work was the subject of several gallery and museum exhibitions, both in Canada and abroad. The Musée d'art de Joliette organized a retrospective in 1986 and the Musée du Bas-Saint-Laurent in 2003, among others. Toupin's work is represented by Galerie Bernard, Montréal and the Lamoureux Ritzenhoff Gallery which organized a retrospective in 2011.

1959		Galerie Denyse Delrue, Montréal

1962		Galerie Agnès Lefort, Montréal

1965		Galerie Camille Hébert, Montréal

1967		Retrospective, Musée d'art contemporain de Montréal

1970		Galerie Arnaud, Paris

1970		Galerie Gilles Corbeil, Montréal

1972		Galerie Arnaud, Paris

1972		Retrospective, Canadian Cultural Centre, Paris

1974		Galerie Bernard Desroches, Montréal

1974		Suite d’Automne, Musée d'art contemporain de Montréal

1976		Galerie Arnaud, Paris

1976		Galerie Bernard Desroches, Montréal

1976		Olympic Stadium, Montréal

1977		Place des Arts, Montréal

1977		Les Jeunesses Musicales du Canada, Mont-Orford

1979		Galerie Frédéric Palardy, Saint-Lambert

1979		Claude Gadoury Art Moderne, Montréal

1980		Galerie Gilles Corbeil, Montréal

1980		Dominion-Corinth Gallery, Ottawa

1981		Retrospective, Collège André-Grasset, Montréal

1982		Galerie Lacerte Guimont, Sillery

1983		Galerie Frédéric Palardy, Saint-Lambert

1984		Galerie Présence, Montréal

1985		La Galerie, Montréal

1986		Galerie Frédéric Palardy, Saint-Lambert

1986		Retrospective, Musée d'art de Joliette

1988		Galerie Bernard Desroches, Montréal

1990		Galerie Bernard Desroches, Montréal

1995		Riverin-Arlogos Art Contemporain, Eastman

2001		Galerie Bernard, Montréal

2003		Retrospective, Musée du Bas-Saint-Laurent, Rivière-du-Loup

2004		Retrospective, Galerie Montcalm, Gatineau

2005		Galerie Bernard, Montréal

2005		Retrospective, Galerie Renée-Blain, Brossard

2006		Retrospective, Musée régional de la Côte Nord, Sept-Iles

2007		Retrospective, Acadia University Art Gallery, Wolfsville, Nova Scotia

2008		Retrospective, Colline Gallery, Edmundston, New Brunswick

2009		Galerie Bernard, Montréal

2009		Retrospective, Maison de la culture Villeray, Montréal

2010		Retrospective, miniature works, Galerie Bernard, Montréal

2011		Retrospective, Galerie Lamoureux Ritzenfoff, Montréal

2013		Galerie Bernard, Montréal

2015		Galerie Bernard, Montréal

Selected group exhibitions
Toupin showed in the exhibitions of the Plasticien group such as the 1955 show at L'Échourie, Montréal as well as in many exhibitions later, both in Canada and abroad. His work was included in the 1975 Canadian canvas show, a travelling exhibit of large paintings to nine Canadian museums and in the 1992 Les Plasticiens exhibition, National Gallery of Canada and in the 2013 Les Plasticiens and the 1950s–1960s, Musée national des beaux-arts du Québec. In 2022, he was included in  Territoires insoupçonnés, Galerie Bernard, Montréal.

1954		Petit salon d’été, Librairie-galerie Tranquille, Montréal

1955		Les Plasticiens, L'Échourie, Montréal

1956		Toupin and Belzile, Montreal Museum of Fine Arts, Gallery XII

1956		Jeune sculpture, Ile Sainte-Hélène, Montréal

1956		Les moins de trente ans, Ile Sainte-Hélène, Montréal

1956		Duo Exhibition, Canada/United States, Parma Gallery, New York

1958		Salon de la jeune peinture, École des beaux-arts de Montréal (winner of first prize)

1958		Les lauréats du Salon de la jeune peinture 1958, Galerie Denyse Delrue, Montréal

1959		Art abstrait, École des beaux-arts de Montréal

1962		Two Worlds Festival, Spoleto, Italy

1966		Canadian Art, travelling exhibit across Canada from the Sayde and Samuel Bronfman collection 

1970		Québec Pavillon, Osaka World Expo, Japan

1972		Fourth International Paintings Festival, Cagnes-sur-Mer, France (winner of national prize for Canada)

1973		Galerie Raymonde Cazenave, Paris

1975		Canadian canvas, travelling exhibit of large paintings to nine Canadian museums

1976		Randall Galleries, New York

1977		Jauran et les premiers plasticiens, Musée d'art contemporain de Montréal

1980		Art Expo, International Art Exposition, New York Coliseum, New York

1980		La collection permanente du Musée, Musée d'art contemporain de Montréal

1980		Dix ans de propositions géométriques, Musée d'art contemporain de Montréal

1980		Randall Galleries, New York

1984		Arte Universal A Través De Los Tiempos, Museo del Palacio de Bellas Artes, Mexico City

1987		Accents de la collection Lavalin, Galerie Lavalin, Montréal

1989		Avant-garde des années ’50 et ’60, Galerie Bernard Desroches, Montréal

1991		Tokyo Central Museum, Japan

1992		La collection: tableau inaugural, Musée d'art contemporain de Montréal

1992		Les Plasticiens, National Gallery of Canada, Musée national des beaux-arts du Québec, Winnipeg Art Gallery

2005		Les Plasticiens, Galerie Simon Blais, Montréal

2008		Cape Breton University Art Gallery, Sydney, Nova Scotia
 
2011		Quiet Mutinies : Art in Québec in the 1950s, The Triangle Gallery of Visual Arts, Calgary, Alberta

2012		La question de l’abstraction, Musée d’art contemporain de Montréal

2013		Les Plasticiens et les années 1950 et 1960, Musée national des beaux-arts du Québec

2013		The Plasticiens and Beyond: Montreal 1955-1970, Varley Art Gallery, Markham, Ontario

2014		Mid-Century Modern, Museum London, London, Ontario

2014		Dialogues formels, Musée d’art contemporain de Baie-Saint-Paul, Québec

2015		Dialogues de l’œil, Permanent Collection of the City of Gatineau

2016		Abstracta Delecta: The Quebec Painters, Winchester Galleries, Victoria, B.C.

2017		Montréal d’hier à aujourd’hui, Galerie Michel-Ange, Montréal

2019		Couleurs Manifestes, Musée des Beaux-arts de Sherbrooke

2022		Territoires insoupçonnés, Galerie Bernard, Montréal

Selected miscellaneous exhibitions
1970–72 Tapestries, ateliers Pierre Daquin, Paris
1971  Germinal, mural for the Musée d'art contemporain de Montréal 
1974  Set creation for "Au-delà du temps/Time out of mind", Les Grands Ballets Canadiens de Montréal
1975  Errances, art book on poems by Fernand Ouellette including seven lithographs
1977  Set creation for "La Scouine", Les Grands Ballets Canadiens
1977  Hochelaga, mural for the Wilfrid-Pelletier Concert Hall at Place des Arts in Montréal
1978  Prochain épisode, art book on the novel by Hubert Aquin including 14 lithographs and one etching
2005  Participates in the documentary of André Desrochers, "L’intuition intuitionnée" on the first movement of Plasticiens

Selected public collections
Toupin's work is in the public art collections of the National Gallery of Canada, Ottawa; the Musée national des beaux-arts du Québec, Québec; the Musée d'art contemporain de Montréal; the Art Gallery of Nova Scotia, Halifax; and in many other public institutions, both in Canada and abroad.

National Gallery of Canada, Ottawa

Musée national des beaux-arts du Québec, Québec

Montreal Museum of Fine Arts

Musée d'art contemporain de Montréal

Musée des beaux-arts de Sherbrooke

Musée d’art de Joliette

Musée Laurier

Musée du Bas-Saint-Laurent, Rivière-du-Loup

Place des arts, Montréal

University of Montreal

City of Montreal (Saint-Laurent district)

City of Brossard

City of Gatineau

Selection Reader`s Digest

Loto-Québec

Banque Nationale du Canada

University of Lethbridge, Alberta

Simon Fraser University, Vancouver

University of Saskatchewan, Saskatoon

Cape Breton University, Sydney, Nova Scotia

Art Gallery of Nova Scotia, Halifax, Nova Scotia

Museum London, London, Ontario

Statische Kunstgalerie, Bochum, Germany

Centre national d'art contemporain, Paris

Memberships
Toupin was a founding member of the Association of Non-Figurative Artists of Montreal (1956). He also was a member of the Royal Canadian Academy of Arts (1977).

Awards
1958  First prize, Salon de la jeune peinture, École des beaux-arts de Montréal 
1972  Fourth international paintings Festival, Cagnes-sur-Mer, France (winner of the national prize for Canada)

References

External links
 Entry for Fernand Toupin on the Union List of Artist Names
 Biography on the website of the Gallery 2000
 Gallery of work on the website of the Gallery 2000
  Galerie Bernard
  Lamoureux Ritzenhoff Gallery
  Artshift

1930 births
2009 deaths
20th-century Canadian painters
Canadian male painters
21st-century Canadian painters
Artists from Montreal
Members of the Royal Canadian Academy of Arts
20th-century Canadian male artists
21st-century Canadian male artists
Canadian abstract artists
Canadian muralists